"Don't Fall Asleep (Horror Pt.2)" is a CD single by Swallow the Sun, released in 2007 by Spinefarm Records.

This song continues in the "Horror" series with Pt. I being "Swallow" previously from Out of This Gloomy Light, Plague of Butterflies or The Morning Never Came, Pt. III being "Lights on the Lake" later on from New Moon & Pt. IV being "Labyrinth of London" later on from Emerald Forest and the Blackbird - This is the only song out of the series not to be written in Roman numeral.

"These Low Lands" is a cover version and original song is done by Timo Rautiainen & Trio Niskalaukaus, from their album Lopunajan merkit. The song is actually called Alavilla mailla, but Swallow the Sun translated the song into English.

Track listing

Chart positions

Credits

Swallow the Sun
Mikko Kotamäki - vocals
Markus Jämsen - guitar
Juha Raivio - guitar, songwriting (1 & 3)
Aleksi Munter - keyboards, engineering, recording
Matti Honkonen - bass
Pasi Pasanen - drums

Additional personnel
Tinuviel - backing vocals (1 & 3)
Jaani Peuhu - backing vocals (1 & 3)
Tomi Joutsen - clean vocals (2)
Tomi Tuomaala - lyrics (2)

Production
Sami Kokko -	engineering, mixing, producer, recording
Hannu Honkonen -	engineering, recording (keyboards)
Minerva Pappi - mastering
Viara Gentchev - logo

2007 singles
2007 songs
Spinefarm Records singles